Anlaby Park is a small suburb just inside the city of Kingston upon Hull, England, to the west.

Geography of Kingston upon Hull